"Sweetheart" is a song released by the Bee Gees, released as the B-side of "I.O.I.O." in March 1970. and released on the album Cucumber Castle in April 1970.

Recording
The song was written by Barry and Maurice Gibb, and featured Barry Gibb on lead vocal. Violins are featured in this song, but the musicians who played theme were not credited. The song was recorded on September 26, 1969. Barry Gibb only sings and play guitar on the song's demo.

It was one of the tracks featuring Terry Cox on drums following the departure of Bee Gees' original drummer Colin Petersen.

Personnel
Barry Gibb — lead and harmony vocal, acoustic guitar
Maurice Gibb — backing vocal, bass and acoustic guitar, piano
Terry Cox — drums
Uncredited — violins, orchestral arrangement

Engelbert Humperdinck version
The song was later recorded by Engelbert Humperdinck and released as a single, and its flipside was "Born to Be Wanted" on Decca Records in UK, Germany and Belgium, on Parrot Records in US and Jugoton Recordsin Yugoslavia. The song was released on his album Sweetheart.

Chart performance

Other versions
Alan Caddy Orchestra and Singers covered "Sweetheart" in 1970 and released on 6 Top Hits and Tribute to Engelbert Humperdinck. Top of the Pops released this song for Top of the Pops, Volume 13 in September 1970 on Hallmark Records. American singer and actor Dean Martin recorded his version also in 1970 and included on For the Good Times.

References

1970 singles
1970 songs
Bee Gees songs
Songs written by Barry Gibb
Songs written by Maurice Gibb
Song recordings produced by Robert Stigwood
Song recordings produced by Barry Gibb
Song recordings produced by Maurice Gibb
Decca Records singles
Engelbert Humperdinck songs
Polydor Records singles
Atco Records singles
Country ballads
Song recordings produced by Peter Sullivan (record producer)